Ogyris zosine, the northern purple azure, is a member of the family Lycaenidae.

Their wingspan is 43-47mm. The larvae feed upon various species in the mistletoe family. As with many Lycaenidae, sugar ants attend the larvae. Mature larvae have pinkish-grey bodies with dark purplish-red spots.

Subspecies
 Ogyris zosine zosine (Brisbane to Ballina)
 Ogyris zosine typhon Waterhouse & Lyell, 1914 (Darwin, Cooktown to Rockhampton)
 Ogyris zosine zolivia Waterhouse, 1941 (Queensland: Hayman, Whitsunday Islands)

References

Arhopalini
Butterflies of Australia
Butterflies described in 1853